K. R. Chandramohan is an Indian politician and leader of Communist Party of India. He represented Chadayamangalam constituency in 7th, 8th and 9th Kerala Legislative Assembly.

References

Communist Party of India politicians from Kerala